The Burns Lake Bungalow, near Los Ojos, New Mexico, was built in 1932.  It was listed on the National Register of Historic Places in 1985.

It built as a part of the 1932-34 Works Progress Administration project to make a hatchery.

References

Bungalow architecture
National Register of Historic Places in Rio Arriba County, New Mexico
Buildings and structures completed in 1932